John Moner was the member of the Parliament of England for Salisbury for the parliament of January 1397. He was also mayor of Salisbury.

References 

Members of Parliament for Salisbury
English MPs January 1397
Year of birth unknown
Mayors of Salisbury
Year of death unknown